The Edelweiss Pirates were a loosely organized group of youths opposed to the status quo of Nazi Germany. They emerged in western Germany out of the German Youth Movement of the late 1930s in response to the strict regimentation of the Hitler Youth. Similar in many ways to the Leipzig Meuten, they consisted of young people, mainly between the ages of 14 and 17, who had evaded the Hitler Youth by leaving school (which was allowed at 14) and were also young enough to avoid military conscription, which was only compulsory from the age of 17 onward. The roots and background of the Edelweiss Pirates movement were detailed in the 2004 film Edelweiss Pirates, directed by Niko von Glasow.

History
The origins of the Edelweißpiraten can be traced to the period immediately prior to World War II, as the state-controlled Hitler Youth (Hitler-Jugend)  was mobilized to indoctrinate young people, at the expense of the leisure activities previously offered to them. This tension was exacerbated once the war began and youth leaders were conscripted. In contrast, the Edelweißpiraten offered young people considerable freedom to express themselves and to mingle with members of the opposite sex. This was unlike Nazi youth movements, which were strictly segregated by sex, the Hitler Youth being for boys and the League of German Girls (Bund Deutscher Mädel) for girls. Although predominantly male, the Edelweißpiraten consisted of both male and female members. The Edelweißpiraten used many symbols of the outlawed German Youth Movement, including their tent (the Kohte), their style of clothing (the Jungenschaftsjacke), and their songs.

The first Edelweißpiraten appeared in the late 1930s in western Germany, comprising mostly young people between 14 and 18. Individual groups were closely associated with different regions but were identifiable by a common style of dress with their own edelweiss badge and by their opposition to what they saw as the paramilitary nature of the Hitler Youth. Subgroups of the Edelweißpiraten included the Navajos, centered on Cologne, the Kittelbach Pirates of Oberhausen and Düsseldorf, and the Roving Dudes of Essen. According to one Nazi official in 1941, "Every child knows who the Kittelbach Pirates are. They are everywhere; there are more of them than there are Hitler Youth... They beat up the patrols... They never take no for an answer."

Although they rejected the Nazis' authoritarianism, the Edelweißpiratens nonconformist behaviour tended to be restricted to petty provocations. Despite this, they represented a group of youth who rebelled against the government's regimentation of leisure and were unimpressed by the propaganda touting Volksgemeinschaft (people's community).

During the war, many Edelweißpiraten supported the Allies and assisted deserters from the German Army. Some groups also collected propaganda leaflets dropped by Allied aircraft and pushed them through letterboxes.

Apart from gatherings on street corners, the Edelweißpiraten engaged in hiking and camping trips, defying the restrictions on free movement, which kept them away from the prying eyes of the totalitarian regime. They were highly antagonistic to the Hitler Youth, ambushing their patrols and taking great pride in beating them up. One of their slogans was "Eternal War on the Hitler Youth". As one subgroup, the Navajos, sang:

Nazi response
The Nazi response to the Edelweißpiraten was relatively slight before the war, because they were viewed as a minor irritant and did not fit in with the policy of selective terror. As the war went on, and some Pirates' activities became more extreme, so did the punishments meted out. Individuals identified by the Gestapo as belonging to the various gangs were often rounded up and released with their heads shaved to shame them. In some cases, young people were sent to concentration camps specifically organized for youths, or temporarily detained in regular prison. On 25 October 1944, Heinrich Himmler ordered a crackdown on the group, and in November of that year, a group of thirteen people, the heads of the Ehrenfelder Gruppe, were publicly hanged in Cologne. Some of these were former Edelweißpiraten. The Edelweißpiraten hanged included six teenagers, among them Bartholomäus Schink, called "Barthel", former member of the local Navajos. Fritz Theilen survived.

Nevertheless, government repression never managed to break the spirit of most groups, which constituted a subculture that rejected the norms of Nazi society. While the Edelweißpiraten assisted army deserters and others hiding from the Third Reich, they have yet to receive recognition as a resistance movement (partly because they were viewed with contempt by many of their former Youth Movement comrades because of their "proletarian" backgrounds and "criminal" activities), and the families of members killed by the Nazis have as yet received no reparations.

Post-World War II
Contrary to what the Allies had hoped, the Edelweißpiraten were neither pro-British nor pro-American. In the early days of the Allied occupation, they sought contact with the occupying authority to intervene on behalf of friends, and even to propose that they might go on patrol, as did the Wuppertal Edelweißpiraten. They were taken seriously and courted by various factions; the first known pamphlets of the  Kommunistische Partei Deutschlands (KPD), in July 1945, were directed at them.

While a small number of Edelweißpiraten remained in the Antifascist Youth and the Free German Youth organizations, the majority turned their backs on these bodies as soon as they realized that, in the words of one member, "politics were taking centre stage again". For example, a group in Bergisch Gladbach disbanded when young people of communist orientation tried to form a majority in the group.

The Edelweißpiraten's turning away from the re-authorized political youth groups forced them into the role of social outcasts and brought them into conflict with the Allies. The headquarters of the American Counter-Intelligence Corps in Frankfurt reported in May 1946 that Edelweiss activities were known throughout the British and American Zones.

Groups identifying themselves as Edelweißpiraten conducted many violent attacks against Soviet Russian and Polish displaced persons. Author Peter Schult witnessed such an attack against a Polish black marketeer. There were also attacks against German women who were known to have been friends or been intimate with British soldiers.

In a trial held by a military court at Uelzen in April 1946, a juvenile named as "Heinz D." was initially sentenced to death, for his "...very active part in carrying out the nefarious schemes of the E. Piraten. An organization such as this might well threaten the peace of Europe." The sentence was commuted the following month to a prison term. In the Soviet Zone, young people suspected of being Edelweißpiraten were sentenced to a virtually obligatory 25 years in prison.

Controversy surrounded the claims that the group were Widerstandskämpfer (resistance fighters) after one member, Fritz Theilen, published his memoirs in 1984, leading to several legal battles that Theilen won. In April 2011, Cologne's mayor, Jürgen Roters, presented Theilen and four other survivors, including Gertrud Koch, the Order of Merit of the Federal Republic of Germany.

See also
 Swingjugend
 White Rose

References

External links
Edelweiss Pirates festival
 
 .
 , discussing the films Edelweißpiraten and Sophie Scholl: The Final Days.
 
 
 .
 .

World War II resistance movements
German resistance to Nazism
German Youth Movement
History of subcultures
German youth culture
Historical youth organisations based in Germany